The Jordanian dinar (code: JOD; unofficially abbreviated as JD) has been the currency of Jordan since 1950. The dinar is divided into 10 dirhams, 100 qirsh (also called piastres) or 1000 fulus. It is pegged to the US dollar.

The Central Bank of Jordan commenced operations in 1964 and became the sole issuer of Jordanian currency, in place of the Jordan Currency Board.

The Jordanian dinar is also widely used in the West Bank alongside the Israeli shekel.

History

In 1927, the British administration of the Palestinian Mandate established the Palestine Currency Board which issued the Palestine pound which was the official currency in both Mandatory Palestine and the Emirate of Transjordan. Though Jordan became an independent kingdom on 25 May 1946, it continued to use the Palestinian pound for a while. In 1949, it passed the Provisional Act No. 35 of 1949, which established the Jordan Currency Board as the sole authority in the kingdom entitled to issue Jordanian currency, called the Jordanian dinar. The Board was based in London and consisted of a president and four members, and began issuing Jordanian dinars in 1949 and was exchangeable for Palestinian pounds at parity.

After Jordan annexed the West Bank in April 1950, the dinar replaced the Palestinian pound. On 1 July 1950, the Jordanian dinar became the kingdom's official currency and legal tender. The use of the Palestine pound ceased in the country on 30 September 1950. The Central Bank of Jordan was established in 1959 and took over note production in 1964. In 1967, Jordan lost control of the West Bank, but the Jordanian dinar continued to be used there. It continues to be widely used in the West Bank alongside the Israeli shekel.

Coins
Coins were introduced in 1949 in denominations of 1, 5, 10, 20, 50 and 100 fils. The first issue of 1 fils were mistakenly minted with the denomination given as "1 fil". 20 fils coins were minted until 1965, with 25 fils introduced in 1968 and  dinar coins in 1970. The 1 fils coin was last minted in 1985. In 1996, smaller  dinar coins were introduced alongside  and 1 dinar coins.

Until 1992, coins were denominated in Arabic using fils, qirsh, dirham and dinar but in English only in fils and dinar. Since 1992, the fils and dirham are no longer used in the Arabic and the English denominations are given in dinar and either qirsh or piastres.

{|class="wikitable" style="font-size: 90%"
|-!colspan=9|Sixth Series Coins
! Value !! Diameter !! Weight !! Composition !! Edge !! Obverse !! Reverse !! First Minted Year || Common Reference
|- 
| 1 qirsh || 25 mm || 5.5 g || Copper-plated steel || Plain || Abdullah II facing right || Lattice design; Eastern Arabic numerals 1 || 2000 ||
|- 
| 5 piastres (qirsh) || 26 mm || 5 g ||rowspan=2| Nickel-plated steel ||rowspan=2| Milled ||rowspan=2| Abdullah II facing right || Lattice design, Eastern Arabic numerals 5 ||rowspan=2| 2000 || 50 fils 'Shilin'''
|- 
| 10 piastres (qirsh) || 28 mm || 8 g || Lattice design, Eastern Arabic numerals 10 || 100 fils, 'Bareezah|- 
|  dinar || 26.5 mmHeptagonal || 7.4 g || Brass || Plain || Abdullah II facing right || Leaf design, Eastern Arabic numerals  || 2004 || Rub'a1, 25 piastres, 250 fils
|- 
||  dinar || 29 mmHeptagonal || 9.6 g || Ring: Aluminium bronzeCenter:' Cupronickel || Plain || Abdullah II facing right || Leaf design, Eastern Arabic numerals  || 2000 ||| Nusf2, 50 piastres, 500 fils
|}

 rub'a is Arabic for "piece of four" or "quarter".
 nusf'' is Arabic for "piece of two" or "half".

Banknotes
They bore the country's official name, "The Hashemite Kingdom of the Jordan". 20 dinar notes were introduced in 1977, followed by 50 dinars in 1999.  dinar notes were replaced by coins in 1999.

Fixed exchange rate
Since October 23, 1995, the dinar has officially been pegged to the IMF's special drawing rights (SDRs), while in practice it was fixed at 1 U.S. dollar = 0.709 dinar most of the time, which is approximately 1 dinar = 1.41044 dollars. The Central Bank buys U.S. dollars at 0.708 dinar per dollar, and sells U.S. dollars at 0.710 dinar per dollar.

A sample exchange rate of Jordanian dinars to US dollars:

See also
 Economy of Jordan
 Economy of the Palestinian territories

References

External links
 Coins of the Hashemite Kingdom of Jordan
 Banknotes of the Hashemite Kingdom of Jordan
 The banknotes of Jordan 

Currencies of Jordan
Fixed exchange rate
Currencies introduced in 1949